These are the official results of the Women's 800 metres event at the 1972 Summer Olympics in Munich. The competition was held on 31 of August and 3 of September.  The favorite coming into the Olympics was West German champion and world record holder Hildegard Falck.  In the 1971 West German Championships she became the first woman to officially better two minutes.  She was the pre Olympic favorite to win the gold on home soil, the rest of the field was wide open to claim the other podium spots.

In the final, like the men's race, the favorite was the slowest starter, though Falck quickly moved into sixth place.  By the end of the first lap the field was tightly packed, Ileana Silai, Vera Nikolić and Svetla Zlateva and three abreast for the lead at 58.31.  At 500 metres, Falck decided to move and slightly accelerated away from Nijolė Sabaitė and Gunhild Hoffmeister but found herself blocked behind the wall.  The wall began to break up during the final turn, Silai the first to start fading allowing Falck some running room, coming off the turn she accelerated into the lead.  Pulling away from the field Falck relaxed to cruise across the finish line.  Sabaitė made a late run at her from a huge deficit, as she came into view, Falck had to accelerate a little to hold her off for a narrow win.  Hoffmeister followed Sabaitė in passing the pack for bronze, but was too far behind to be competitive for higher medals.

While the 2 minute barrier had been broken barely a year before this race, five women finished under 2 minutes here, with the remainder of the field bunched within .17 of a second of 2 minutes.  While the world record was 1:58.5 (hand timed at the time), this electronically timed 1:58.55 was intrinsically faster, but that conversion was not included in record keeping.  Zlateva would improve the world record the following year.

Heats
The top three runners in each heat (blue) and the next fastest (pink), advanced to the semifinal round.

Heat one

Heat two

Heat three

Heat four

Heat five

Semifinals

Top four in each heat advanced to the final round.

Heat one

Heat two

Final

Key: OR = Olympic record; DNS = did not start; DNF = did not finish

References

External links
Official report

Women's 800 metres
800 metres at the Olympics
1972 in women's athletics
Women's events at the 1972 Summer Olympics